RAF Cleave is a former Royal Air Force station located  north of Bude in Cornwall, United Kingdom, which was operational from 1939 until 1945. Despite a few periods of intense activity, it was one of Fighter Command's lesser used airfields.

History
RAF Cleave was conceived as housing target and target support aircraft for firing ranges along the north Cornwall coast, and land was acquired from Cleave Manor.

In May 1939, two flights of No. 1 Anti-Aircraft Co-operation Unit RAF (1 AACU) with the Westland Wallace, and a naval steam catapult was soon erected near the cliffs for the pilotless Queen Bee aircraft due to be stationed there.  Aircraft were initially housed in temporary Bessonneau hangars (type H of World War I vintage), and later replaced by more permanent structures.

In December 1943, the four flights were amalgamated into 639 Squadron, which served at Cleave for the remainder of the war.

The airfield was placed under care and maintenance in April 1945, and later became a government signals station.

Posted squadrons

Current use

Apart from an undisturbed piece of the grass runway to the north, a very short section of concrete perimeter track, and a few of the married quarters accommodation on Cleave Crescent, the site has been almost completely re-modelled as GCHQ Bude.

References

Citations

Bibliography

Lake, A (1999) Flying units of the RAF, Airlife Publishing, Shrewsbury, 316pp & 16 App, .
Smith, G (2000) Devon and Cornwall Airfields in the Second World War, Countryside Books, Newbury, 288pp, .
Willis, S and Holliss, B R (1987), Military airfields in the British Isles 1939-1945 (Omnibus Edition), Enthusiasts Publications, Newport Pagnell, 283pp, .

External links

RAF Cleave – web page with extensive descriptive photo gallery, at AtlantikWall.co.uk
web page showing many photos of the remaining RAF Cleave implacements around the Morwenstow site – at DerelictPlaces.co.uk

Royal Air Force stations in Cornwall
Royal Air Force stations of World War II in the United Kingdom
Military history of Cornwall
Morwenstow